Manglietia was the name of a genus of flowering plants in the family Magnoliaceae, with about 40 Asian species listed.  The genus is now considered a synonym of the well-known and similar Magnolia.

They are trees with leathery leaves and green or red flowers.

Species
Species with pages here include:
 Manglietia aromatica Dandy is a synonym of Magnolia aromatica (Dandy) VS Kumar
 Manglietia grandis Hu & Cheng is a synonym of Magnolia grandis (Hu & Cheng) VS Kumar
 Manglietia megaphylla Hu & Cheng is a synonym of Magnolia dandyi
 Manglietia ovoidea Hung T. Chang is a synonym of Magnolia ovoidea
 Manglietia sinica (Law) B.L.Chen & Noot. is a synonym of Magnolia sinica

References

 
Magnoliales genera
Taxonomy articles created by Polbot
Historically recognized angiosperm genera